The Naval Air Training Command (NATRACOM) is a one star command that conducts flight training of student Naval Aviators,  and Naval Flight Officers. Though it does not conduct Naval Aircrew training which is conducted by Naval Education and Training Command's Naval Aviation Schools Command (NASC), it is responsible for monitoring the production of Aircrewmen through the Naval Aviator Production Process (NAPP).  Through the NAPP, NATRACOM is also responsible for programming and monitoring the production of all (currently 19) Navy and Marine Corps Fleet Replacement Squadrons.

It conducts operations aboard five Naval Air Stations in three states. The Mission of Naval Air Training Command is to train the world’s finest combat quality aviation professionals, delivering them at the right time, in the right numbers, and at the right cost.

Commanded by RDML Richard T. Brophy, the Chief of Naval Air Training (CNATRA), CNATRA and NATRACOM are headquartered on board Naval Air Station Corpus Christi, Texas. As recently as 2009, NATRACOM's 739 aircraft logged 358,449 flight hours, nearly a third of the Department of the Navy total for that fiscal year. To put those numbers in perspective, CNATRA flew 28% of the combined Navy and Marine Corps flight hours with 19% of the aircraft. In that same time more than 2,400 Naval Aviators, Naval Flight Officers (NFO) and Naval Aircrewmen earned their “Wings of Gold”.

Subordinate commands

CNATRA leads the Naval Air Training Command (NATRACOM) composed of five Training Air Wings. The five active wings are home to seventeen Training Squadrons, designated VT and HT squadrons. 
 Training Air Wing One Tail Code "A" at NAS Meridian, Mississippi
VT-7 Eagles, Advanced training in the T-45C Goshawk
VT-9(2nd) Tigers, Advanced training in the T-45C Goshawk
 Training Air Wing Two Tail Code "B" at NAS Kingsville, Texas
VT-21 Redhawks, Advanced training in the T-45C Goshawk
VT-22 Golden Eagles, Advanced training in the T-45C Goshawk
 Training Air Wing Four Tail Code "G" at NAS Corpus Christi, Texas 
VT-27 Boomers, Primary training in the T-6B Texan II
VT-28 Rangers, Primary training in the T-6B Texan II
VT-31 Wise Owls, Advanced training in the T-44C Pegasus
VT-35 Stingrays, Advanced training in the T-44C Pegasus
 Training Air Wing Five Tail Code "E" at NAS Whiting Field, Florida
VT-2 Doerbirds, Primary training in the T-6B Texan II
VT-3 Red Knights, Primary training in the T-6B Texan II
VT-6 Shooters, Primary training in the T-6B Texan II
HT-8 Eightballers, Advanced training in the TH-57B/C Sea Ranger
HT-18 Vigilant Eagles, Advanced training in the TH-57B/C Sea Ranger
HT-28 Hellions, Advanced training in the TH-57B/C Sea Ranger
 Training Air Wing Six Tail Code "F" at NAS Pensacola, Florida
VT-4 Warbucks, Advanced NFO training in the Multi-Crew Simulator
VT-10 Wildcats, Primary NFO training in the T-6A Texan II
VT-86 Sabrehawks, Advanced NFO training in the T-45C Goshawk

There were three Training Air Wings which have been disestablished (with assigned squadrons)
Training Air Wing Three Tail Code "C" at the former NAS Chase Field, Texas: Disestablished 31 Aug 1992
VT-24 Bobcats: Disestablished
VT-25 Cougars: Disestablished
VT-26 Tigers: Disestablished
Training Air Wing Seven Tail Code 2S until 1974,Tail Code F through 1976 disestablishment at the former NAS Saufely Field, Florida: Disestablished 1 Dec 1976
VT-1 Eaglets: Disestablished
VT-5 Tigers: Disestablished
Training Air Wing Eight at the former NAS Glynco, Georgia: Disestablished Aug 1974 
VT-86 Sabrehawks: Transferred to Training Air Wing Six
Disestablished or Deactivated other Training Squadrons 
VT-9(1st) Tigers: Established at Training Air Wing ONE, disestablished July 1987
VT-23 Professionals: Established at Training Air Wing TWO, transferred to Training Air Wing ONE in 1994, deactivated 30 Sep 1999
VT-29: Established at Training Air Wing FOUR, disestablished 31 Dec 1976 (was a land based multi-engine aircraft navigator training squadron)

CNATRA also oversees the Naval Flight Demonstration Squadron (NFDS) Blue Angels.

Naval Air Stations
NATRACOM conducts flight operations at the following Naval Air Stations:
 NAS Corpus Christi, Corpus Christi, Texas
 NAS Kingsville, Kingsville, Texas
 NAS Meridian, Meridian, Mississippi
 NAS Pensacola, Pensacola, Florida
 NAS Whiting Field, Milton, Florida

Naval Aviation Enterprise (NAE)
The NATRACOM is part of the Naval Aviation Enterprise (NAE), reporting to Commander, Naval Air Forces.

See also
List of United States Navy aircraft designations (pre-1962) / List of United States naval aircraft
Military aviation
Modern United States Navy carrier air operations
Naval aviation
Naval flight officer
United States Naval Aviator

References

External links
 Official site: https://www.cnatra.navy.mil/index.htm

Shore commands of the United States Navy
Air units and formations of the United States Navy